The 1980 Masters Tournament was the 44th Masters Tournament, held April 10–13 at Augusta National Golf Club in Augusta, Georgia.

Seve Ballesteros, age 23, won his first Masters and second major championship title, four strokes ahead of runners-up Jack Newton and Gibby Gilbert. Ballesteros had a seven stroke lead after 54 holes and extended it to ten strokes after the front nine of the final round at 16-under-par, eyeing the Masters record of 271 (−17) set by Jack Nicklaus in 1965 (and equaled by Raymond Floyd in 1976). A new record (of 270 or lower) was to be rewarded with a $50,000 bonus from Golf magazine. An hour later, after he found the water at 12 and 13 at Amen Corner, the lead had been reduced to three. Ballesteros regrouped with a birdie at 15 and parred the rest to shoot even-par 72 for the round and held on for the victory.

Well back in the field on Sunday, Nicklaus, age 40, was paired with Arnold Palmer, age 50, which drew large galleries. Palmer shot 69 to finish at even par and T24, Nicklaus had 73 to finish at 291 (+3) and T33. It was their first pairing at Augusta in five years and the first time Palmer had finished higher than Nicklaus there since 1967. Nicklaus regrouped and won two majors in 1980, the U.S. Open and the PGA Championship and was the runner-up the following April.

Ballesteros, of Spain, was the first winner of the Masters from Europe, and won a second green jacket in 1983.

This was the final Masters with Bermuda and ryegrass greens, which were replaced with bentgrass following this tournament.

Field
1. Masters champions
Tommy Aaron, George Archer, Gay Brewer, Billy Casper, Charles Coody, Raymond Floyd (8,11), Doug Ford, Bob Goalby, Jack Nicklaus (3,4,8,9), Arnold Palmer, Gary Player (8,9), Sam Snead, Art Wall Jr., Tom Watson (3,8,11), Fuzzy Zoeller (8,12)

Jack Burke Jr., Jimmy Demaret, Ralph Guldahl, Claude Harmon, Ben Hogan, Herman Keiser, Cary Middlecoff, Byron Nelson, Henry Picard, and Gene Sarazen did not play.

The following categories only apply to Americans

2. U.S. Open champions (last five years)
Lou Graham (8,11), Hubert Green (8,11,12), Hale Irwin (8,9,12), Andy North (8,9), Jerry Pate (9,10)

3. The Open champions (last five years)
Johnny Miller (11)

4. PGA champions (last five years)
John Mahaffey (12), Dave Stockton, Lanny Wadkins (8,12)

5. 1979 U.S. Amateur semi-finalists
Cecil Ingram III (a), Mark O'Meara (6,a), Joey Rassett (a)

John Cook (6) forfeited his exemption by turning professional.

6. Previous two U.S. Amateur and Amateur champions
Jay Sigel (7,a)

7. Members of the 1979 U.S. Walker Cup team
Doug Clarke (a), Doug Fischesser (a), Mike Gove (a), Jim Holtgrieve (a), Griff Moody (a), Hal Sutton (a), Marty West (a)

Scott Hoch and Mike Peck forfeited their exemptions by turning professional.

8. Top 24 players and ties from the 1979 Masters Tournament
Miller Barber, Bobby Clampett (a), Lee Elder (9,12), Joe Inman, Tom Kite (12), Billy Kratzert, Bruce Lietzke, Gene Littler, Artie McNickle, Jim Simons (9), J. C. Snead, Ed Sneed (9), Craig Stadler (11), Leonard Thompson, Lee Trevino (11,12)

9. Top 16 players and ties from the 1979 U.S. Open
Ben Crenshaw (10,11), Keith Fergus, Bob Gilder, Larry Nelson (11,12), Calvin Peete (11), Tom Purtzer, Bill Rogers, Tom Weiskopf

10. Top eight players and ties from 1979 PGA Championship
Rex Caldwell, Gibby Gilbert, Jay Haas, Don January, Ron Streck, Howard Twitty (11)

11. Winners of PGA Tour events since the previous Masters
Andy Bean (12), George Burns, Jim Colbert, Dave Eichelberger, Ed Fiori, John Fought, Al Geiberger, Lon Hinkle, Wayne Levi, Jerry McGee, Jeff Mitchell, Gil Morgan (12), Jack Renner, Chi-Chi Rodríguez, Curtis Strange, Doug Tewell, D. A. Weibring

12. Members of the U.S. 1979 Ryder Cup team
Mark Hayes

13. Foreign invitations
Isao Aoki, Seve Ballesteros (3,8), David Graham (4,9,10), Mark James, Sandy Lyle, Graham Marsh (9), Peter McEvoy (6,a), Tōru Nakamura, Jack Newton (8)

Numbers in brackets indicate categories that the player would have qualified under had they been American.

Round summaries

First round
Thursday, April 10, 1980

Source:

Second round
Friday, April 11, 1980

Source:

Third round
Saturday, April 12, 1980

Source:

Final round
Sunday, April 13, 1980

Final leaderboard

Sources:

Scorecard
Final round

Cumulative tournament scores, relative to par

References

External links
Masters.com – past winners
Augusta.com – 1980 Masters leaderboard and scorecards

1980
1980 in golf
1980 in American sports
1980 in sports in Georgia (U.S. state)
April 1980 sports events in the United States